The Element of Surprise is the fourth studio album by American rapper E-40, released August 11, 1998, on Jive and Sick Wid It Records. The album features production by Ant Banks, Bosko, Mike Mosley, Rick Rock, Sam Bostic, Studio Ton & Tone Capone. It peaked at number 4 on the Billboard Top R&B/Hip-Hop Albums and at number 13 on the Billboard 200. The album features guest performances by fellow members of The Click: B-Legit, D-Shot and Suga-T, as well as Jayo Felony, C-Bo, Mack 10, WC, Busta Rhymes, Levitti and Master P. The second to last track, "Ballin' Outta Control", originally appeared on the 1993 extended play, The Mail Man.

Along with a single, a music video was produced for the song "Hope I Don't Go Back", featuring Otis & Shug. A second single, "From the Ground Up", was also released as a music video, featuring Too Short, K-Ci & JoJo. The album eventually went Gold. In 2013 E-40 ranked what he considers to be his ten best albums, and named The Element of Surprise as his best album overall.

Track listing

Charts

Weekly charts

Year-end charts

Certifications

References

E-40 albums
1998 albums
Albums produced by Ant Banks
Albums produced by Rick Rock
Albums produced by Bosko
Albums produced by Studio Ton
Jive Records albums
Sick Wid It Records albums
Gangsta rap albums by American artists